Humboldt Township is a township in Minnehaha County, in the U.S. state of South Dakota.

Humboldt, South Dakota, is the town in Humboldt township.

History
Humboldt Township was named for Alexander von Humboldt, a German scientist and writer.

References

Townships in Minnehaha County, South Dakota
Townships in South Dakota